Cristo Rey Brooklyn High School is a private, Roman Catholic high school in Brooklyn, New York.  The school opened in August 2008 with an initial freshman class of 43 students, and operates within the Roman Catholic Diocese of Brooklyn. In 2013 it moved to more spacious quarters in the East Flatbush neighborhood of Brooklyn.

History
The school opened on the site of the former Our Lady of Lourdes Elementary School, which closed in June 2005. Lourdes Academy opened in August 2008 and graduated its first class in 2012. In July 2011, Lourdes Academy was renamed Cristo Rey Brooklyn High School. It is part of the Cristo Rey Network of high schools. Its goal is to give children from low-income families a better chance for a college education, and assistance is available if they cannot pay the $2000 annual tuition.

In 2013 Cristo Rey Brooklyn moved to the premises of the former Catherine McAuley High School in East Flatbush, Brooklyn. In also partnered with Boys Hope Girls Hope New York to provide boarding facilities for 50 girls in the former convent on the premises, from Sunday through Friday each week.

Activities 
Sports sponsored by the school: 
     
FALL
 Cross Country
 Girls Varsity Soccer
 Boy Varsity Soccer 
 Girls Volleyball
     
WINTER
 Girls Varsity Basketball
 Boys Varsity Basketball
 Boys JV Basketball
 Indoor Track
 Ski Club
    
SPRING
 Varsity Baseball
 Varsity Softball
 Outdoor Track
 Club Boxing

Activities sponsored by the school include:
    
 African Dance
 Art
 Caribbean Dance
 Cheerleading
    
 Classic Film Club
 Contemporary Dance
 Film Making
 Girls Who Code 
     
 Student Ambassadors
 Student Government
 Step Team
 Yearbook

In 2016, twelve students participated in the third annual service trip, this year to Nicaragua. raising funds for the trip through various fundraisers and through the organization Courts for Kids.

References

Further reading
 Kearney, G. R. More Than a Dream: The Cristo Rey Story: How One School's Vision Is Changing the World. Chicago, Ill: Loyola Press, 2008.

External links
 School website
 Cristo Rey Network
 Fr. John P. Foley honored with Presidential Citizen's Medal
60 minutes
Cristo Rey Featured in WashPost column by George Will
 Boston Globe - With sense of purpose, students cut class for a day 
 Bill & Melinda Gates Foundation - Success of Innovative Urban Catholic School Sparks Major Investment

Educational institutions established in 2008
Roman Catholic Diocese of Brooklyn
Cristo Rey Network
Roman Catholic high schools in Brooklyn
2008 establishments in New York City